Troja may refer to:

Places 

Troy, in Asia Minor
Troja (Epirus), a town in ancient Epirus
 Troja, ancient name of Cestria (Epirus), a town of ancient Epirus
Troja, Kosovo, a hamlet in Kosovo near Gjakova
Troja/Ljungby, an ice hockey club in Ljungby, Sweden
Troja Palace, a palace/château in Prague, Czech Republic
Troja (Prague), a cadastral area of Prague, Czech Republic
 Troja, an ancient name of Xypete, a deme in ancient Attica
Troia, Apulia, formerly known as Troja
Troja railway station, Jamaica

People

 Troja (surname), a surname
 Troja (singer), American musical theater performer

Other 

 Troja (band), a heavy metal band from Kosovo

See also 
 Troia (disambiguation)
 Troya (disambiguation)
 Troy (disambiguation)